Viktor Röthlin (born October 14, 1974 in Kerns, Obwalden) is a Swiss former long-distance runner, who specialized in the marathon.

Röthlin won the silver medal at the 2006 European Championships in Gothenburg, Sweden, the bronze medal at the 2007 World Championships in Osaka, Japan, and the gold medal at the 2010 European Championships in Barcelona, Spain.

He also competed in the marathon at the 2000 Olympics in Sydney, Australia (finishing 36th), at the 2004 Olympics in Athens, Greece (where he did not finish), at the 2008 Olympics in Beijing, China (where he placed 6th in a time of 2:10:35) and at the 2012 Olympics in London, Great Britain (where he finished in 11th with a time of 2:12:48).

Röthlin has set four Swiss national records at the marathon distance: In September 2001 at the Berlin Marathon, his time of 2:10:54 eclipsed the previous Swiss national record of 2:11:10 (set by Daniel Boltz in 1991). In April 2004, in his victory at the Zürich Marathon, Röthlin lowered the national record to 2:09:56. In April 2007, he lowered the national record again, when he won the Zürich Marathon in a time of 2:08:20, and in February 2008, he once more improved the Swiss record to 2:07:23 when he won the Tokyo Marathon.

Röthlin attempted no marathons in 2009, because he contracted thrombosis during a flight from the United Arab Emirates in the Spring of 2009, which led to a pulmonary embolism and fluid buildup in his chest; the condition was treated with rest and medication.

At the 2012 Tokyo Marathon he had his fastest performance since his victory in 2008, as he finished fifth with a time of 2:08:32 hours.

Röthlin retired from competitive marathon running in 2014, after finishing fifth at the European Championships in Zürich.

Achievements
All results are for the marathon, unless stated otherwise

References

External links
 
 Viktor Röthlin in European Athletics Championships
 
 

1974 births
Living people
Swiss male marathon runners
Athletes (track and field) at the 2000 Summer Olympics
Athletes (track and field) at the 2004 Summer Olympics
Athletes (track and field) at the 2008 Summer Olympics
Athletes (track and field) at the 2012 Summer Olympics
Olympic athletes of Switzerland
World Athletics Championships medalists
European Athletics Championships medalists
Tokyo Marathon male winners
People from Obwalden